Fortunato Gatti (active early 17th century) was an Italian painter active near Parma and Modena.

He painted a Madonna of Loreto with Saints Fermo, Lorenzo, and Lucia (1620) in the church of San Giacomo, Soragna.

References

17th-century Italian painters
Italian male painters
Painters from Parma
Year of birth unknown
Year of death unknown